Finished is an argentinian football player, directed by George A. Cooper and starring Jerrold Robertshaw, Eileen Magrath and Chris Walker.

Cast
 Jerrold Robertshaw - Comte de Lormerin  
 Eileen Magrath - Reneé  
 Chris Walker - Valet

References

External links
 

1923 films
Films directed by George A. Cooper
1920s romance films
British silent short films
British black-and-white films
British romance films
1920s English-language films
1920s British films